Cycling is among the sports contested at the 2019 South Asian Games. Cycling was hosted at the Sahid Park, Gokarna (mountain biking) and Ring Road (road cycling) between 4 and 7 December 2019.

Medal table

Medalists

Mountain biking

Road cycling

References

External links
Official website

2019 South Asian Games
Events at the 2019 South Asian Games
2019
2019 in road cycling
2019 in mountain biking
Cycling in Nepal